Luc Krotwaar (born 25 January 1968 in Bergen op Zoom, North Brabant) is a Dutch long-distance runner, who is nicknamed 'The White Kenyan'.

Running career
In the spring of 2003 Krotwaar ran 2:19.42 in the Rotterdam Marathon and only eight days later 2:13.41 in the Utrecht marathon.

In the fall of 2003, he ran a personal best of 2:10.13 in Fukuoka. He qualified for the 2004 Summer Olympics, but eventually did not start. Krotwaar finished fifteenth at the 2005 World Championships marathon and fourth at 2:12:44 in the 2006 European Athletics Championships in Gothenburg. He finished second in the 2006 Posbankloop in Velp.

External links

1968 births
Living people
Dutch male long-distance runners
Dutch male marathon runners
Sportspeople from Bergen op Zoom
20th-century Dutch people